Lee Jung-hoon (born November 20, 1991), better known by his stage name Yoon So-ho, is a South Korean theatre and musical actor.

From November 2015 to March 2016, Yoon portrayed Marius Pontmercy in a South Korean adaptation from the musical Les Misérables, for which he won the Daegu International Musical Festival (DIMF) Award for Best New Actor.

Theater

Awards and nominations

References

1991 births
Living people
People from Daegu
21st-century South Korean male actors
South Korean male stage actors
South Korean male musical theatre actors
South Korean male actors